is a passenger railway station located in the city of Inabe, Mie Prefecture, Japan, operated by the private railway operator Sangi Railway.

Lines
Misato Station is served by the Sangi Line, and is located 17.1 kilometres from the terminus of the line at Kintetsu-Tomida Station.

Layout
The station consists of a single island platform connected to the station building by a level crossing.

Platforms

Adjacent stations

History
Misato Station was opened on July 23, 1931. From June 1, 1968, to March 25, 1986, the station was named . The station building was rebuilt in 1986. On November 8, 2012, a derailment accident occurred at this station.

Passenger statistics
In fiscal 2019, the station was used by an average of 311 passengers daily (boarding passengers only).

Surrounding area
Inabe City Misato Elementary School

See also
List of railway stations in Japan

References

External links

Sangi Railway official home page

Railway stations in Japan opened in 1931
Railway stations in Mie Prefecture
Inabe, Mie